Michael Howard Hillardt (born 22 January 1961) is an Australian former middle distance runner who reached the semi finals of the 1500m at the 1984 Summer Olympics Mike also finished 7th in the 1500m final at the [1987 world championships], beating Steve Cram to the finish line. 1985 World Indoor Champion and gold medal at 1500m. Australian 1500 Record of 3:33 was bettered in 1990. Hillardt ranks seventh all time Australian in the 1500m and eighth all time in the one mile event. He held both Australian records for a period.

References

1961 births
Living people
Australian male middle-distance runners
Olympic athletes of Australia
Athletes (track and field) at the 1982 Commonwealth Games
Athletes (track and field) at the 1986 Commonwealth Games
Athletes (track and field) at the 1984 Summer Olympics
World Athletics Indoor Championships winners
Commonwealth Games competitors for Australia
20th-century Australian people
21st-century Australian people